Doodia caudata is a species of dimorphic, evergreen fern in the family Blechnaceae, native to Australia and New Zealand. Upright clusters of fertile fronds reach 10 inches (25 cm) in length. It has been introduced to the Azores, Madeira and Sri Lanka.

References

 FloraBase entry
 Sue Olsen, Encyclopedia of garden ferns, Timber Press, 2007, page 208. .

Blechnaceae